Jamal Benomar (born c. April 1957) is a former UN diplomat. He worked at the UN for 25 years, including as a special envoy for Yemen and a special adviser to former Secretary-General Ban Ki-moon.

Early life and education
Benomar was born in April 1957 in Nador, north of Morocco. At 19, as a political activist known for his peaceful opposition to the government, he was arrested and imprisoned for eight years.

"I just 'disappeared'," he told the New Internationalist in 1986. "That night I was tortured from midnight to 5 o'clock in the morning. They used the classical methods: binding the hands and feet of my naked body to an iron bar and whipping the soles of my feet while forcing my head back in a bucket of excrement."

After eight months in a secret detention centre in Casablanca, Benomar was finally charged—with conspiracy to overthrow the government, threatening state security, and membership of illegal organisations—and moved to a regular jail.

He and other political prisoners went on a hunger strike to demand their right to a fair trial. The trial finally took place. It lasted seven weeks, and at the end, Benomar and his fellow 130 defendants were  all found guilty and handed heavy sentences.

By this time, Amnesty International had been made aware of the cases, and each of the 130 prisoners was adopted by a regional group. Benomar's group in Sweden wrote to him for two years before he finally received one of their letters. When he and other prisoners went on a 45-day hunger strike, Amnesty sent telegrams and issued appeals on their behalf. "It was a great moral support to know that there were people in the other end of the world who were organising all these activities for my release, people who didn't know me but were concerned about human rights," Benomar said. "It gave me quite a lot of courage."

During his time in prison, Benomar earned a bachelor's degree and two master's degrees from the Sorbonne in Paris. Following Amnesty's efforts and interventions by his professor in Paris, he was released in 1983, re-arrested soon after and then re-released in 1984, but placed under house arrest.

Escaping house arrest in 1984, he fled Morocco on a fisherman's boat and flew from Spain to the UK, where he was granted political asylum, Benomar continued his studies at the Sorbonne and completed his doctorate at the University of London. He went on to become a lecturer and research associate in African and Middle Eastern politics at the University of Paris VII, and worked as an Africa specialist for Amnesty International in London.

Prior to his UN career, Benomar served as Director of the Human Rights Program for the Carter Center of Emory University where he worked with former US president Jimmy Carter on human rights, mediation and conflict resolution issues.

Career

United Nations
In his career at the UN, Benomar worked for the Office of the High Commissioner for Human Rights (OHCHR), the United Nations Development Programme (UNDP) and the Department of Political Affairs (DPA).

His work has largely focused on peacebuilding and governance issues in conflict countries. In 2005 he helped to establish the United Nations Peacebuilding Commission and Peacebuilding Support Office, which he also directed. He has advised on conflict resolution issues in over 30 countries, including Yemen, Afghanistan and Iraq, where in 2004 he served as the Secretary-General's Envoy to support the National Dialogue Conference.

The Under Secretary-General has authored numerous publications dealing with governance, rule of law, constitution writing and peace building.

He has been described as "quintessentially political" by the head of the Centre for Humanitarian Dialogue, David Harland, who has worked closely with Benomar. "He is not a simple man who is willing to put all of his cards on the table," Harland told the Atlantic Council in 2014.

On 9 November 2015, Benomar was appointed as the UN Secretary-General's Special Adviser for Conflict Prevention. In that role he led the UN response to the political crisis in Burundi.

Special Envoy for Yemen
In Yemen, Benomar served for four years as the UN Secretary-General's Special Envoy.  Benomar led the Office of the Special Envoy of the Secretary-General for Yemen, where he worked "to facilitate the combined efforts of the international community to promote a democratic transition in the country". Benomar brokered the country's Transition Agreement in November 2011, facilitated the successful conclusion of the National Dialogue Conference in January 2014, which took 10 months of deliberations, and mediated the Peace and National Partnership Agreement in September 2014. Benomar facilitated a new round of negotiations, in February and March.

The talks were close to a conclusion, when on March 25, 2015, the Saudis intervened militarily. Less than a month later, Benomar resigned. In a statement delivered to the press following his final briefing on Yemen to the Security Council, Benomar condemned "systematic acts of obstruction" and warned against "interference and coercion from outside forces". "I stressed [to the Security Council] that getting the political process back on track and achieving lasting peace and stability in Yemen could only be reached through Yemeni-led peaceful negotiations, where Yemenis could determine their future," he said.

Benomar warned that Yemen’s conflict could become an “Iraq-Libya-Syria” scenario if either side pushes for control of the country, prompting the U.N. Security Council to threaten further measures if the hostilities do not end. “It would be an illusion to think that the Houthis could mount an offensive and succeed in taking control of the entire country. It would be equally false to think that President Hadi could assemble sufficient forces to liberate the country from the Houthis. Any side that would want to push the country in either direction would be inviting a protracted conflict in the vein of an Iraq-Libya-Syria combined scenario,” he said. The statement sparked outrage among the Saudis and their Gulf allies, who poured scorn on Benomar in the Arabic-speaking media.

Qatar
On July 20, 2018, Politico reported that in a California court filing that week, Republican fundraiser Elliott Broidy had accused Benomar as serving as an undeclared agent of Qatar. Broidy "cited unspecified evidence turned up during discovery as the basis for those claims." Broidy's filing "claims Benomar is evading service of a subpoena and that seeks permission to serve him by email or mail."

To avoid being subject to the lawsuit, Benomar retroactively asserted immunity as a Moroccan diplomat. According to a U.S. national security official, "Morocco's effort is a transparent scam. Its effort to shield a Qatari agent from prosecution could do serious damage to its relationship with the U.S."

Personal life
A British citizen, Benomar is married with four children, and lives in the U.S. state of New York.

References

1957 births
Living people
Moroccan diplomats
Naturalised citizens of the United Kingdom
Moroccan officials of the United Nations
Moroccan emigrants to the United Kingdom
Special Representatives of the Secretary-General of the United Nations
UN Special Envoys for Yemen